Diane Gujarati (born July 6, 1969) is a United States district judge of the United States District Court for the Eastern District of New York. She was nominated by both former US President Barack Obama and President Donald Trump, but she was only confirmed under Trump.

Biography 

Gujarati's father was an economics professor and her mother was a high school social studies teacher. She received  her Bachelor of Arts degree, summa cum laude, from the Barnard College of Columbia University in 1990 and her Juris Doctor from Yale Law School in 1995. She began her legal career as a law clerk to Judge John M. Walker Jr. of the United States Court of Appeals for the Second Circuit from 1995 to 1996.

After completing her clerkship, Gujarati was an associate in the New York City office of Davis Polk & Wardwell from 1996 to 1999. She became an Assistant United States Attorney for the Southern District of New York in 1999, and served as Deputy Chief of the Appeals Unit in the Office's Criminal Division from 2006 to 2008. She was Deputy Chief of the Office's White Plains Division from 2008 to 2010, and then Chief from 2010 to 2012. From 2012 to 2020, Gujarati was the Deputy Chief of the Criminal Division of the United States Attorney's Office for the Southern District of New York. She previously served as an adjunct professor of clinical law at New York University School of Law.

Federal judicial service

Expired nomination to district court under Obama 

On September 13, 2016, President Barack Obama nominated Gujarati to serve as a United States district judge of the United States District Court for the Eastern District of New York, to the seat vacated by Judge John Gleeson, who resigned on March 9, 2016. She was recommended to Obama by U.S. Senator Kirsten Gillibrand. Gujarati's  nomination drew no controversy, but it occurred late in Obama's presidency and was not acted upon. Her nomination expired on January 3, 2017, with the end of the 114th Congress.

Renomination to district court under Trump 

In August 2017, Gujarati was one of several candidates pitched to U.S. Senators from New York Chuck Schumer and Kirsten Gillibrand by the White House as part of a bipartisan package of judicial candidates for vacancies on the federal courts in New York. On May 10, 2018, President Donald Trump announced his intent to nominate Gujarati to serve as a United States district judge of the United States District Court for the Eastern District of New York. On May 15, 2018, her nomination was sent to the Senate. On August 1, 2018, a hearing on her nomination was held before the Senate Judiciary Committee. On September 13, 2018, her nomination was reported out of committee by a 21–0 vote.

On January 3, 2019, her nomination was returned to the President under Rule XXXI, Paragraph 6 of the Senate. On April 8, 2019, President Trump announced the renomination of Gujarati to the district court. On May 21, 2019, her nomination was sent to the Senate, she was renominated to the same seat. On June 20, 2019, her nomination was reported out of committee by voice vote. On September 9, 2020, the Senate invoked cloture on her nomination by a 94–2 vote. On September 10, 2020, her nomination was confirmed by a 99–0 vote, with Senator Kamala Harris, who was on the campaign trail for her vice-presidential bid as the Democratic nominee, being the only Senator not to vote. She received her judicial commission on September 18, 2020. Upon taking office, Gujarati became  the first Indian American to serve as an Article III federal judge in New York.

Personal life 

Gujarati has been married since 2000 to Charles Chesnut, a web site builder.

References

External links 
 

1969 births
Living people
20th-century American lawyers
20th-century American women lawyers
21st-century American lawyers
21st-century American judges
21st-century American women lawyers
American academics of Indian descent
American jurists of Indian descent
Assistant United States Attorneys
Barnard College alumni
Davis Polk & Wardwell lawyers
Judges of the United States District Court for the Eastern District of New York
Lawyers from New York City
New York University School of Law faculty
New York (state) lawyers
United States district court judges appointed by Donald Trump
Yale Law School alumni
21st-century American women judges